The Panax (ginseng) genus belongs to the Araliaceae (ivy) family. Panax species are characterized by the presence of ginsenosides and gintonin. Panax is one of approximately 60 plant genera with a classical disjunct east Asian and east North American distribution. Furthermore, this disjunct distribution is asymmetric as only two of the ~18 species in genus are native to North America.

Etymology

The name Panax, meaning "all-healing" in Greek, shares the same origin as "panacea" and was used for this genus because Carl Linnaeus was aware of its wide use in Chinese medicine.

Panax species
Genus Panax
Subgenus Panax
Section Panax
Series Notoginseng
Panax notoginseng  (Burkill) F.H.Chen  (known as san qi, tian qi or tien chi)
Series Panax
Panax assamicus (Assam Ginseng) 
Panax bipinnatifidus  Seem.  
var. angustifolius  (Burkill) J.Wen 
Panax ginseng  C.A.Mey.  (Asian ginseng, Chinese ginseng, Korean ginseng, Asiatic ginseng, Oriental ginseng)
Panax japonicus  (T.Nees) C.A.Mey.  (Japanese ginseng)
Panax quinquefolius  L.  (American ginseng)
Panax sokpayensis  Shiva K.Sharma & Pandit 
Panax vietnamensis  Ha & Grushv. 
Panax wangianus  S.C.Sun 
Panax zingiberensis  C.Y.Wu & Feng 
Section Pseudoginseng
Panax pseudoginseng  Wall. 
Panax stipuleanatus  H.T.Tsai & K.M.Feng 
Subgenus Trifolius
Panax trifolius  L. 

Hybrids:
 Panax ginseng × Panax quinquifolius
 Panax japonicus f. typicum × Panax quinquifolius

References

External links

 
Apiales genera
Plants used in traditional Chinese medicine